The Corinthian order (Korinthiakós rythmós) is the last developed of the three principal classical orders of Ancient Greek architecture and Roman architecture. The other two are the Doric order which was the earliest, followed by the Ionic order.  In Ancient Greek architecture, the Corinthian order follows the Ionic in almost all respects other than the capitals of the columns.

When classical architecture was revived during the Renaissance, two more orders were added to the canon: the Tuscan order and the Composite order. The Corinthian, with its offshoot the Composite, is the most ornate of the orders. This architectural style is characterized by slender fluted columns and elaborate capitals decorated with acanthus leaves and scrolls. There are many variations.

The name Corinthian is derived from the ancient Greek city of Corinth, although the style had its own model in Roman practice, following precedents set by the Temple of Mars Ultor in the Forum of Augustus (c. 2 AD). It was employed in southern Gaul at the Maison Carrée, Nîmes and at the comparable Temple of Augustus and Livia at Vienne. Other prime examples noted by Mark Wilson Jones are the lower order of the Basilica Ulpia and the Arch of Trajan at Ancona (both of the reign of Trajan, 98–117 AD), the Column of Phocas (re-erected in Late Antiquity but 2nd century in origin), and the Temple of Bacchus at Baalbek (c. 150 AD).

Description

Greek Corinthian order
The Corinthian order is named for the Greek city-state of Corinth, to which it was connected in the period. However, according to the architectural historian Vitruvius, the column was created by the sculptor Callimachus, probably an Athenian, who drew acanthus leaves growing around a votive basket. Its earliest use can be traced back to the Late Classical Period (430–323 BC). The earliest Corinthian capital was found in Bassae, dated at 427 BC.

Roman Corinthian order

Proportion is a defining characteristic of the Corinthian order: the "coherent integration of dimensions and ratios in accordance with the principles of symmetria" are noted by Mark Wilson Jones, who finds that the ratio of total column height to column-shaft height is in a 6:5 ratio, so that, secondarily, the full height of column with capital is often a multiple of 6 Roman feet while the column height itself is a multiple of 5. In its proportions, the Corinthian column is similar to the Ionic column, though it is more slender, and stands apart by its distinctive carved capital.

The abacus upon the capital has concave sides to conform to the outscrolling corners of the capital, and it may have a rosette at the center of each side. Corinthian columns were erected on the top level of the Roman Colosseum, holding up the least weight, and also having the slenderest ratio of thickness to height. Their height to width ratio is about 10:1.

One variant is the Tivoli order, found at the Temple of Vesta, Tivoli. The Tivoli order's Corinthian capital has two rows of acanthus leaves and its abacus is decorated with oversize fleurons in the form of hibiscus flowers with pronounced spiral pistils. The column flutes have flat tops. The frieze exhibits fruit festoons suspended between bucrania. Above each festoon has a rosette over its center. The cornice does not have modillions.

Gandharan capitals

Indo-Corinthian capitals are capitals crowning columns or pilasters, which can be found in the northwestern Indian subcontinent, and usually combine Hellenistic and Indian elements. These capitals are typically dated to the 1st centuries of our era, and constitute important elements of Greco-Buddhist art of Gandhara.

The classical design was often adapted, usually taking a more elongated form, and sometimes being combined with scrolls, generally within the context of Buddhist stupas and temples. Indo-Corinthian capitals also incorporated figures of the Buddha or Bodhisattvas, usually as central figures surrounded, and often in the shade, of the luxurious foliage of Corinthian designs.

Renaissance Corinthian order

During the first flush of the Italian Renaissance, the Florentine architectural theorist Francesco di Giorgio expressed the human analogies that writers who followed Vitruvius often associated with the human form, in squared drawings he made of the Corinthian capital overlaid with human heads, to show the proportions common to both.

The Corinthian architrave is divided in two or three sections, which may be equal, or may bear interesting proportional relationships, to one with another. Above the plain, unadorned architrave lies the frieze, which may be richly carved with a continuous design or left plain, as at the U.S. Capitol extension. At the Capitol the proportions of architrave to frieze are exactly 1:1. Above that, the profiles of the cornice mouldings are like those of the Ionic order. If the cornice is very deep, it may be supported by brackets or modillions, which are ornamental brackets used in a series under a cornice.

The Corinthian column is almost always fluted, and the flutes of a Corinthian column may be enriched. They may be filleted, with rods nestled within the hollow flutes, or stop-fluted, with the rods rising a third of the way, to where the entasis begins. In French, these are called chandelles and sometimes terminate in carved wisps of flame, or with bellflowers. Alternatively, beading or chains of husks may take the place of the fillets in the fluting, Corinthian being the most flexible of the orders, with more opportunities for variation.

Elaborating upon an offhand remark when Vitruvius accounted for the origin of its acanthus capital, it became a commonplace to identify the Corinthian column with the slender figure of a young girl; in this mode the classifying French painter Nicolas Poussin wrote to his friend Fréart de Chantelou in 1642:

The beautiful girls whom you will have seen in Nîmes will not, I am sure, have delighted your spirit any less than the beautiful columns of Maison Carrée for the one is no more than an old copy of the other.

Sir William Chambers expressed the conventional comparison with the Doric order:

The proportions of the orders were by the ancients formed on those of the human body, and consequently, it could not be their intention to make a Corithian column, which, as Vitruvius observes, is to represent the delicacy of a young girl, as thick and much taller than a Doric one, which is designed to represent the bulk and vigour of a muscular full grown man.

History

The oldest known example of a Corinthian column is in the Temple of Apollo Epicurius at Bassae in Arcadia, c. 450–420 BC. It is not part of the order of the temple itself, which has a Doric colonnade surrounding the temple and an Ionic order within the cella enclosure. A single Corinthian column stands free, centered within the cella. This is a mysterious feature, and archaeologists debate what this shows: some state that it is simply an example of a votive column. A few examples of Corinthian columns in Greece during the next century are all used inside temples. A more famous example, and the first documented use of the Corinthian order on the exterior of a structure, is the circular Choragic Monument of Lysicrates in Athens, erected c. 334 BC.

A Corinthian capital carefully buried in antiquity in the foundations of the circular tholos at Epidaurus was recovered during modern archaeological campaigns. Its enigmatic presence and preservation have been explained as a sculptor's model for stonemasons to follow in erecting the temple dedicated to Asclepius. The architectural design of the building was credited in antiquity to the sculptor Polykleitos the Younger, son of the Classical Greek sculptor Polykleitos the Elder. 

The temple was erected in the 4th century BC. These capitals, in one of the most-visited sacred sites of Greece, influenced later Hellenistic and Roman designs for the Corinthian order. The concave sides of the abacus meet at a sharp keel edge, easily damaged, which in later and post-Renaissance practice has generally been replaced by a canted corner. Behind the scrolls the spreading cylindrical form of the central shaft is plainly visible.

Much later, the Roman writer Vitruvius (c. 75 BC – c. 15 BC) related that the Corinthian order had been invented by Callimachus, a Greek architect and sculptor who was inspired by the sight of a votive basket that had been left on the grave of a young girl. A few of her toys were in it, and a square tile had been placed over the basket, to protect them from the weather. An acanthus plant had grown through the woven basket, mixing its spiny, deeply cut leaves with the weave of the basket.

Claude Perrault incorporated a vignette epitomizing the Callimachus tale in his illustration of the Corinthian order for his translation of Vitruvius, published in Paris, 1684. Perrault demonstrates in his engraving how the proportions of the carved capital could be adjusted according to demands of the design, without offending. The texture and outline of Perrault's leaves is dry and tight compared to their 19th-century naturalism at the U.S. Capitol. 

A Corinthian capital may be seen as an enriched development of the Ionic capital, though one may have to look closely at a Corinthian capital to see the Ionic volutes ("helices"), at the corners, perhaps reduced in size and importance, scrolling out above the two ranks of stylized acanthus leaves and stalks ("cauliculi" or caulicoles), eight in all, and to notice that smaller volutes scroll inwards to meet each other on each side. The leaves may be quite stiff, schematic and dry, or they may be extravagantly drilled and undercut, naturalistic and spiky. 

In Late Antique and Byzantine practice, the leaves may be blown sideways, as if by the wind of Faith. Unlike the Doric and Ionic column capitals, a Corinthian capital has no neck beneath it, just a ring-like astragal molding or a banding that forms the base of the capital, recalling the base of the legendary basket.

Most buildings (and most clients) are satisfied with just two orders. When orders are superposed one above another, as they are at the Colosseum, the natural progression is from sturdiest and plainest (Doric) at the bottom, to slenderest and richest (Corinthian) at the top. The Colosseum's topmost tier has an unusual order that came to be known as the Composite order during the 16th century. The mid-16th-century Italians, especially Sebastiano Serlio and Jacopo Barozzi da Vignola, who established a canonic version of the orders, thought they detected a "Composite order", combining the volutes of the Ionic with the foliage of the Corinthian, but in Roman practice volutes were almost always present.

In Romanesque and Gothic architecture, where the Classical system had been replaced by a new aesthetic composed of arched vaults springing from columns, the Corinthian capital was still retained. It might be severely plain, as in the typical Cistercian architecture, which encouraged no distraction from liturgy and ascetic contemplation, or in other contexts it could be treated to numerous fanciful variations, even on the capitals of a series of columns or colonettes within the same system.

During the 16th century, a sequence of engravings of the orders in architectural treatises helped standardize their details within rigid limits: Sebastiano Serlio; the Regola delli cinque ordini of Giacomo Barozzi da Vignola (1507–1573); I quattro libri dell'architettura of Andrea Palladio, and Vincenzo Scamozzi's L'idea dell'architettura universale, were followed in the 17th century by French treatises with further refined engraved models, such as Perrault's.

Notable examples

 Argentina
 Palace of the Argentine National Congress 
Bangladesh
Tajhat Palace, Rangpur
 France
 Maison Carrée, Nimes
 The July Column,
 Germany
 Palatine Chapel, Aachen
 The Reichstag, Berlin
 Greece
 Choragic Monument of Lysicrates, Athens
 Temple of Olympian Zeus (Athens)
 Israel
 Seat of the Universal House of Justice, Haifa
 Italy
 Pantheon, Rome
 Temple of Mars Ultor
 Temple of Vesta, Tivoli
 Jordan
 Jarash
 Jabal al-Qal'a, Amman
 Philippines
 St. La Salle Hall
 Don Enrique T. Yuchengco Hall
 Enrique M. Razon Sports Center
 Portugal
 Templo de Diana, Évora
 Column of Pedro IV, Lisbon
 Romania
 New Saint George Church of Bucharest
 Royal Palace of Bucharest
 The Church from the Antim Monastery
 Central University Library of Bucharest
 Monteoru House
 Russia
 Winter Palace
 Saint Isaac's Cathedral
 Singapore
 Old City Hall
South Africa
Houses of Parliament, Cape Town
Syria
Bosra
Damascus: Temple of Jupiter
Latakia: Colonnade of Bacchus
Palmyra
 Ukraine
 Great Lavra Belltower (fourth tier – 8 columns)
 Independence Monument
 United Kingdom
 Nelson's Column in Central London
 University College London
 United States of America
 United States Capitol 
 United States Supreme Court Building
 The Rotunda, University of Virginia
 New York Stock Exchange

Gallery

See also
 Giant order
 Superposed order

Notes

References
Lawrence, A. W., Greek Architecture, 1957, Penguin, Pelican history of art

External links
 
Classical orders and elements

Order
Ancient Greek architecture
Ancient Roman architectural elements
Orders of columns